Cackalack is a 2010 studio album by Americana singer-songwriter Jonathan Byrd.  The title is a variation of the word "Cackalacky", a popular (though at times derogatory) nickname for the Carolinas and the songs all connect to the culture and music of Byrd's home state of North Carolina.  The album was recorded in a single day with a group of musicians, including members of Creaking Tree String Quartet.

Reception 

The recording was well received by DJs playing folk and Americana music formats.  It reached No. 22 on the Americana Music Association radio chart during the week of February 7, 2011. The album was also ranked No. 3 for the month of January 2011 on the Folk DJ-L radio chart.  The most played tracks included "Cakalack!" and "I Was An Oak Tree". The album also reached No. 1 on the Roots Music Report "Top 50 Folk" chart.

In a review, Folk Alley's Jim Blum described the album as "much more rootsy than his previous releases, and sometimes quite bluegrassy.

Track listing 
All songs written by Jonathan Byrd unless indicated otherwise
 "Chicken Wire" (Jonathan Byrd & Tom Gould) – 3:39
 "Wild Ponies" – 4:41
 "I Was an Oak Tree" – 2:44
 "Reckon I Did" – 3:48
 "New Moon Rise" – 3:53
 "Dungarees Overalls" – 2:10
 "Father's Day" – 4:01
 "White Oak Wood" – 3:24
 "Scuppernong" – 3:11
 "Cackalack!" (Jonathan Byrd & Leonard Podolak) – 2:18
"Livers & Gizzards" (Hidden tracks/outtakes available as WAV files on the CD release)
 "38 Baby" – 2:49
 "Amelia My Dream" – 5:15
 "Arkansas Traveler's Check" (traditional) – 3:01
 "Blackberry Blossom" (traditional) – 2:21
 "Dream Life" – 3:20
 "Maureen" – 3:01

Credits 
Musicians:
 Jonathan Byrd – guitar & vocals
 John Showman – fiddle & vocals
 Brian Kobayakawa – bass & vocals
 Andrew Collins – mandolin & vocals
 Chris Quinn – banjo & vocals
 Treasa Levasseur – piano, accordion & vocals
 Ken Whitely – National Steel & vocals

Production:
 Produced – Jonathan Byrd
 Executive producers – Ed & Jand Grant, Jim & Brenda Prescott
 Recorded – Ken Whitely & Nik Tjelios at Casa Wroxton, Toronto, Ontario, November 23, 2009
 Mixed – Jonathan Byrd & Jerry Brown at The Bonus Room, Hillsborough, North Carolina, & The Rubber Room, Chapel Hill, North Carolina
 Baby photo – Darling Art, (darling-art.com)
 Design – John Dixon (haledixon.com)

Notes and sources 

Jonathan Byrd (musician) albums
2010 albums